Mascoutah Township is located in St. Clair County, Illinois. As of the 2010 census, its population was 8,217 and it contained 3,335 housing units.

Geography

Demographics

References

External links
City-data.com
St. Clair County Official Site
Illinois State Archives

Townships in St. Clair County, Illinois
Townships in Illinois